Norman Woodliffe Moore (15 October 1919 – 14 March 2007) was an English professional footballer who played as a centre forward. He played in the Football League for four clubs between 1946 and 1952, scoring 48 goals in 97 league appearances.

Career
Born in Grimsby, Moore played for Grimsby Town, Hull City, Blackburn Rovers, Bury and Goole Town.

Personal life
Moore was from a footballing family; his brother Roy and his three nephews (Andy, David and Kevin) all also played for Grimsby Town.

References

1919 births
2007 deaths
Footballers from Grimsby
English footballers
Grimsby Town F.C. players
Hull City A.F.C. players
Blackburn Rovers F.C. players
Bury F.C. players
Goole Town F.C. players
English Football League players
Association football forwards